The title of Professor of Egyptology may refer to the holders of one of the following professorial chairs:

 Edwards Professor of Egyptian Archaeology and Philology, at University College London
 Professor of Egyptology (Oxford), at the University of Oxford
 Sir Herbert Thompson Professor of Egyptology, at the University of Cambridge